Bijoya may refer to:

 Bijoya, 2019 Bengali film directed by Kaushik Ganguly
 Bijoya Chakravarty, Indian politician from the Bharatiya Janata Party
 Bijoya Ray, wife of Satyajit Ray